The 2022 Egypt Cup Final will be a football match to decide the winner of the 2021–22 Egypt Cup, the 90th season of the Egypt Cup. It was scheduled to take place on 3 February 2023 at the Cairo International Stadium, but it has been postponed due to Al Ahly's participation in the FIFA Club World Cup.

Route to the final

Match

Details

References

2021–22 in Egyptian football
Al Ahly SC matches
Pyramids FC matches